Guzmania nicaraguensis is a plant species in the genus Guzmania. This species is native to Central America (all countries except El Salvador) and Mexico (Veracruz, Oaxaca, Chiapas).

References

nicaraguensis
Flora of Central America
Flora of Mexico
Plants described in 1903